Bashir Ladan is an academician and the current vice chancellor of Kebbi State University of Science and Technology, in Aliero, Kebbi State Nigeria. Bashir took over from the acting vice chancellor Bello Shehu and was appointed by Atiku Bagudu, the Governor of Kebbi State.

References

Living people
Nigerian academic administrators
Year of birth missing (living people)